The Proto-Cuneiform numerals are one of the most complex systems of enumeration in any early writing system. Their decipherment took place over several phases in the 20th century, including major advances in Adam Falkenstein’s 1936 signlist, specific studies by Jöran Friberg [de] and A. A. Vajman, and ultimately the identification and decipherment of fifteen distinct systems of enumeration in the collaborative efforts of Peter Damerow and Robert K. Englund in the 1980s as part of the Archaische Texte aus Uruk project.

Basis 
Alongside the decipherment of specific numerical systems, Denise Schmandt-Besserat has long argued that Proto-Cuneiform signs generally, including both numerical and non-numerical signs, were based on three-dimensional tokens that were in use in the ancient Near East for millennia. This idea, which seems to be based on a suggestion from Amiet, has been subjected to a great deal of discussion and criticism. There is a widespread consensus that the plain tokens, particularly those found within clay bullae, correspond to the proto-cuneiform numerical signs, but the link that Schmandt-Besserat posited between complex or decorated tokens and the non-numerical proto-cuneiform signs is disputed.

Decipherment 
Many numerical signs and some systems of enumeration are shared between the Proto-Cuneiform numerical system and the Proto-Elamite numerical signs, but the most surprising feature of the proto-cuneiform numerals is that the same numerals can appear in different numerical systems with different values. Because of this, certain numerical systems, such as the system for measuring grain, were misconstrued for decades in the mid-20th century. S. Langdon, probably influenced by V. Scheil, argued that grain notations were based on a decimal system, but this was disproven by Jöran Friberg in the late 1970s. Building on Friberg's work on the system for grain measurement as well as A. A. Vajman's work on the sexagesimal and bisexagesimal systems, Peter Damerow and Robert K. Englund carried out a systematic classification and study of the proto-cuneiform numerals in all known texts in the 1980s, ultimately identifying fifteen distinct numerical systems.

See also 
 Babylonian cuneiform numerals

References 

Babylonian mathematics
Numeral systems